Tunet Valley is a semi-circular ice-filled valley on the north side of Mount Hochlin, in the Muhlig-Hofmann Mountains of Queen Maud Land. Mapped by Norwegian cartographers from surveys and air photos by the Norwegian Antarctic Expedition (1956–60) and named Tunet (the courtyard).

Valleys of Queen Maud Land
Princess Martha Coast